Mratín is a municipality and village in Prague-East District in the Central Bohemian Region of the Czech Republic. It has about 1,400 inhabitants.

History

The first written mention of Mratín is from 1372.

References

External links
Official website 
Information portal 

Villages in Prague-East District